Hugo Díaz Rodríguez (born 9 February 1997), known as Hugo Díaz, is a Spanish footballer who plays a centre back for Korona Kielce. He can also play as a defensive midfielder.

Club career

Early career
Díaz started his career at Deportivo La Coruña youth academy, graduating to Depor Juvenil A and then the Deportivo de La Coruña B team, in January 2017 he then had a loan spell at A Coruña based team Silva SD.

Leeds United
On 18 August 2017, he joined Leeds United from Deportivo, initially linking up with the Leeds Under 23s squad. In the Under 23s he formed a central defence partnership with Paudie O'Connor.

On 10 April 2018, after an injury crisis to Leeds' first team defenders, Díaz was promoted to Leeds' first team and named as a substitute in their EFL Championship game against Preston North End. Díaz made his debut for Leeds in the same game coming on early in the second half for injured centre back Pontus Jansson, partnering his usual Under 23 teammate Paudie O'Connor for the first team in a 1–3 loss. On 8 May, he was named in Leeds' first team squad by Head Coach Paul Heckingbottom for their post season friendlies tour to Myanmar.

He featured in Leeds' first team during the 2018/19 pre season under new head coach Marcelo Bielsa. He made his first appearance for Leeds' first team of pre-season in the friendly match 1–1 draw against York City on 20 July 2018

He was named in the first team squad again on 6 January 2019, when he was an unused subsistute during a 2–1 defeat to Queens Park Rangers in the third round of the FA Cup.

Díaz captained the Leeds United 23s side over the course of the 2018/19 season, that won the PDL Northern League 2018/19 Season by winning the league, they then became the national Professional Development League Champions by beating Birmingham City in the final.

On 22 June 2019, Díaz announced on his Twitter page that the club had released him.

Getafe
On 25 July 2019, Díaz joined La Liga side Getafe CF on a free transfer from Leeds United, being assigned to the B-team in Segunda División B. Diaz was released by Getafe CF in July 2020

Korona Kielce
On 13 November 2020, Díaz was signed by I liga side Korona Kielce

Career statistics

Notes

References

External links

1997 births
Living people
Spanish footballers
Footballers from A Coruña
Association football defenders
Tercera División players
Deportivo Fabril players
Getafe CF B players
Leeds United F.C. players
Spanish expatriate footballers
Expatriate footballers in England
Expatriate footballers in Poland
Spanish expatriate sportspeople in England
Spanish expatriate sportspeople in Poland
English Football League players